Sovetsky District is an administrative and municipal district (raion), one of the forty-three in Rostov Oblast, Russia. It is located in the northeast of the oblast. Its administrative center is the rural locality (a stanitsa) of Sovetskaya. Population: 6,692 (2010 Census);  The population of Sovetskaya accounts for 34.1% of the district's total population.

History
The district was established in 1990.

References

Notes

Sources

Districts of Rostov Oblast

